WABG (960 AM) is an American radio station broadcasting a delta blues and classic rock format and licensed to serve the community of Greenwood, Mississippi, United States.  The station is currently owned by SPB LLC.

History
The station was assigned call sign WJGJ on December 29, 2004.  On May 10, 2005, the station changed its call sign back to WABG.  Previously the station broadcast a talk radio format.

References

External links

ABG
Radio stations established in 1950
1950 establishments in Mississippi
Blues radio stations
Classic rock radio stations in the United States